Baseball New Brunswick is the provincial governing body for baseball in New Brunswick, Canada.

References

External links
 Official Website

Sport in New Brunswick
Baseball governing bodies in Canada
Sports governing bodies in New Brunswick
1989 establishments in New Brunswick
Organizations based in Fredericton
Sports organizations established in 1989